Raul Nantes (born 20 March 1990) is a Brazilian handball player for Limoges Handball and the Brazilian national team.

He represented Brazil at the 2019 World Men's Handball Championship.

References

1990 births
Living people
Brazilian male handball players
Pan American Games medalists in handball
Pan American Games gold medalists for Brazil
Pan American Games bronze medalists for Brazil
Handball players at the 2015 Pan American Games
Handball players at the 2019 Pan American Games
Expatriate handball players
Brazilian expatriate sportspeople in Spain
Brazilian expatriate sportspeople in Romania
Brazilian expatriate sportspeople in France
People from São José dos Campos
Liga ASOBAL players
CB Ademar León players
CS Dinamo București (men's handball) players
Medalists at the 2015 Pan American Games
Medalists at the 2019 Pan American Games
Sportspeople from Mato Grosso do Sul